The 2021 FC Barcelona presidential election took place on 7 March 2021 for electing the 42nd President of the club.

History
Initially the election was to be held on 24 January 2021 but was later postponed due to the increased cases of COVID-19 in Spain in January. Carles Tusquets was the preceding interim President of the club who took over from Josep Maria Bartomeu after the latter resigned on 27 October 2020. However, Tusquets did not contest the elections. 9 pre candidates ran for the presidency. These include former club President Joan Laporta, Victor Font, Emili Rousaud, Toni Freixa, Jordi Farre, Augusti Benedito, Xavi Vilajona, Lluis Fernadez, and Pere Riera.

In order to advance to the main election the candidates had to collect a minimum of 2,257 signatures from club members. Joan Laporta, Victor Font and Toni Frexia were the only remaining candidates.

On 6 March, a day before the election, the club received a total of 20,663 votes by post early as those many members did not want to vote at the polling stations and cause crowds due to the pandemic. The remaining votes were cast on 7 March. Joan Laporta easily won returning as president of FC Barcelona. He received 54.28% of the vote. Victor Font came second with 29.99% of the vote and Toni Freixa came last with 8.58% of the vote.

See also 
 2015 FC Barcelona presidential election
 History of FC Barcelona
 List of FC Barcelona presidents

References 

FC Barcelona
Barcelona
2021 in Catalonia